Jaloo is a village and union council (an administrative subdivision) of Mansehra District in Khyber-Pakhtunkhwa province of Pakistan. It is located in Mansehra Tehsil at 34°19'0N 73°9'0E and has an altitude of 1008 metres (3310).

References

Union councils of Mansehra District
Populated places in Mansehra District